Jiro Manio (born , 9 May 1992) is a Filipino actor who started acting at the age of seven in the film Pamana in 1999.

Early life and education
Manio was born to a Filipina mother Joylene Santos (died August 8, 2006) and Japanese father . He was raised by his grandfather and had a younger brother named Anjo Santos.

Manio attended grade school at Holy Child Parochial School in San Juan, Metro Manila (now Saint John the Baptist Catholic School) and graduated from high school in 2012 through the Philippines Department of Education's (DepEd) home study program at Rizal Experimental Station and Pilot School of Cottage Industries (RESPCI) in Pasig. He planned to study Hotel and Restaurant Management (HRM) in culinary studies at the De La Salle-College of Saint Benilde in the Malate district of Manila.

Career
He starred in the digital film Tambolista for Cinema One network and in Ang Tanging Ina Niyong Lahat with Ai-Ai delas Alas. In 2004, he won the Best Actor at the Gawad Urian and the Best Child Actor award at the Filipino Academy of Movie Arts and Sciences Awards (FAMAS) for the movie Magnifico.

He was a member of ABS-CBN's talent management agency Star Magic from 1999 until his termination in June 2009 due to unprofessional behavior.

In 2010, he transferred to GMA Network and appeared on that network's show Pilyang Kerubin, top billed by Barbie Forteza.

Personal life and substance abuse
Manio later became a drug addict and fathered two daughters named Sisha Calliope and Mishka Caxiopeia out of wedlock with his longtime partner who is four years his senior. He had his first-born when he was fifteen years old.

On May 18, 2011, the news programme TV Patrol confirmed that Manio underwent rehabilitation treatment for drug addiction. He then entered a drug rehabilitation facility after realizing that he was throwing his life away. With the encouragement of his foster father, Andrew, and his manager, Magnifico director Maryo J. delos Reyes, he committed himself to the Home Care rehabilitation center, where he underwent therapy for almost a year. After the initial phase of his rehabilitation, Home Care allowed him to finish his senior year of high school.

On June 30, 2015, Manio was spotted wandering around Ninoy Aquino International Airport (NAIA) Terminal 3. Manio, who was scavenging for food and living off the kindness of airport staff, had apparently run away and gone missing from Cainta four days before, following a supposed altercation with relatives.

On July 1, 2015, four days after wandering around NAIA, he was finally brought home by his half brother, Anjo Santos, after Manio's relative saw his picture that appeared on different social networking sites.

Comedian Ai-Ai delas Alas and other artists offered Manio their help to get his life back on the right track, but he refused it.

When he was asked by reporters if he is still open to new projects in the near future, Manio refused to continue his work as an actor.

In January 2016, Manio was released from a rehabilitation center after months of treatment but returned to in February due to his chronic health condition.

Frustrated homicide case
Manio was arrested for allegedly stabbing a man in Marikina around 7:20 pm on January 17, 2020.

Filmography

Television

Film

Awards and nominations

References

External links
 
 Official website

1992 births
Living people
Actors of Japanese descent
Filipino male child actors
Filipino male film actors
Filipino male television actors
Filipino people of Japanese descent
Male actors of Japanese descent
Star Magic
People from Cainta
Tagalog people
ABS-CBN personalities
GMA Network personalities